Lost Creek is a stream in DeKalb and Gentry counties in the U.S. state of Missouri.It is a tributary of Grindstone Creek.

According to tradition, the creek was named for an incident when a party of soldiers were lost during a blizzard near the creek.

See also
List of rivers of Missouri

References

Rivers of DeKalb County, Missouri
Rivers of Gentry County, Missouri
Rivers of Missouri